Naama "Nami" Melumad (born December 5, 1988) is an Israeli-Dutch film and television composer based in Los Angeles. She is best known for her work on Paramount+'s series, Star Trek: Strange New Worlds and Star Trek: Prodigy  , Marvel's Thor: Love and Thunder, the HBO Max film An American Pickle, the Amazon TV series Absentia, and the virtual reality video game Medal of Honor: Above and Beyond

Early life and career
Nami was born and raised in Ramat Gan, Israel. She attended Blich High School where she majored in music theory, composition, flute performance, and chemistry. While at school, she began developing an interest in film scoring and also wrote the score for a children's theatre play.  She played classical piano, flute, and guitar.  Upon completing her military service in the Israel Defense Forces, Nami was accepted directly to the sophomore year at the Cross-Disciplinary Composition Division of the Jerusalem Academy of Music and Dance and earned a Bachelor of Music in composition.  Among her teachers were Ioseb Bardanashvili, Michael Wolpe, and Rafi Kadishzon.  She composed mainly for documentary films, short-form narratives, commercials and stage. Nami moved to Los Angeles in 2014 to attend the graduate program in scoring for motion pictures and television (previously known as SMPTV) at the Thornton School of Music at the University of Southern California.

Nami scored over 130 projects, including feature films, TV series, short films and more. She is the first woman to score an episode in the Star Trek franchise, the Star Trek: Short Treks episode, "Q&A" and won several awards for her work including the Hollywood Music in Media Awards for Passage (2018), Best Short Score at Fimucité (2017) out 908 scores, and The Marshall Hawkins Award-Best Original Score at Idyllwild Festival of Cinema (2018). Her score for Over the Wall earned her a nomination at the XIV Jerry Goldsmith Awards (2019).

She was one of the 12 composers around the world to make the cut for the acclaimed ASCAP 2016 film scoring workshop with composer Richard Bellis.  In October 2016 her score to Mindgame was performed live-to-picture by the Helix Collective Ensemble, at the Ebell Theatre in Los Angeles. In May 2017 her work New Zealand's Guide To Tessering was performed by the Hollywood Chamber Orchestra.  As an orchestrator, she worked on The Little Mermaid and Logic's album Everybody.

In 2019, Nami created original music for the Senior Love Triangle feature film. 

Nami is a member of Women in Film (Los Angeles), a board member of the Alliance for Women Film Composers, and a voting member of the Television Academy.

Selected discography
As Composer
 Thor: Love and Thunder (2022) – in collaboration with Michael Giacchino
Star Trek: Strange New Worlds (2022) (TV Series)
The Woman in the House Across the Street from the Girl in the Window (2022) (TV Series)
Far from the Tree (2021)
Star Trek: Prodigy (2021–2022) (TV Series)
 Medal of Honor: Above and Beyond (2020) – (video game) in collaboration with Michael Giacchino
 An American Pickle (2020) – *based on original themes by Michael Giacchino
 Absentia (2019–2020) (TV Series, Amazon/Sony)
 Star Trek: Short Treks: "Q & A" (2019) (TV Episode, CBS/The Secret Hideout)
 Dead End (2019) (TV Series, Kan)
 Senior Love Triangle (2019)
 Before the Dawn (2019)
 Miss Arizona (2018) (Side Gig Productions)
 Subira (2018)
 The Adventures of Thomasina Sawyer (2018)
 Trico Tri Happy Halloween (2018)
 Church & State (Documentary) (2018)
 This Day Forward (2018)
 Passage (Short Film) (2018)
 The Big Nothing (2017) (TV Series, Israel's YES Kidz Channel)

Awards and nominations

References

External links 
 
 

1988 births
Women film score composers
Women television composers
Israeli women composers
Israeli film score composers
Dutch film score composers
Jewish Israeli musicians
Living people
Television composers
People from Ramat Gan
Jewish_women musicians
Jewish_composers
Jewish_women_composers